Brompton is a civil parish in the Scarborough district of North Yorkshire, England, containing the villages of Brompton-by-Sawdon and Sawdon.

It lies on the northern edge of the Vale of Pickering, with the village of Sherburn 3 miles to the south.
According to the 2011 UK census, Brompton parish had a population of 573, an increase on the 2001 UK census figure of 516.

Under 'Brompton', the sign on entry to the village reads 'The Birthplace Of Aviation' owing to the long-term residence of pioneering aeronautical engineer Sir George Cayley. Brompton has been the seat of the Cayley family since the Middle Ages, and Sir George Cayley was buried in the graveyard of All Saints' Church in 1857.

The poet William Wordsworth married Mary Hutchinson at All Saints' Church in the village, on 4 October 1802.  A copy of the wedding certificate can be seen in All Saints Church.

Low Hall, off Barnard Lane, is the former manor house of the village; the current building dates from the 17th century and is Grade II listed.

Brompton Hall is a Georgian town house in the village centre, now a special school.

References

Civil parishes in North Yorkshire